The División de Honor 2014–15 was the 52nd  season of the top flight of the Spanish domestic field hockey competitions since its inception in 1958. It began in autumn 2014. First regular season matchday was played on 28 September and the last on 26 April. 

Final Four was played in Terrassa on 2–3 May. 

R.C. Polo was defending champions while R.C. Jolaseta and CD Terrassa were the teams relegated to División de Honor B.

R.C. Polo won its 13th title by defeating Club Egara in the Championship Final 1–1(4–3) in the shoot-outs, equalizing Club Egara's titles.

Competition

Format
The División de Honor regular season takes place between September and April through 18 matchdays in a round-robin format. Upon completion of regular season, the top four teams are qualified to play the Final Four, while bottom two teams are relegated to División de Honor B. Points are awarded according to the following:
2 points for a win
1 points for a draw

Teams

Regular season standings

Final four
Final Four was played in Terrassa on 2–3 May at Pla del Bonaire.

Semifinals

Final

Top goalscorers 
Regular season only.

References

See also
División de Honor Femenina de Hockey Hierba 2014–15

External links
Official site

División de Honor de Hockey Hierba
Spain
field hockey
field hockey